The Journal of Environmental Economics and Management is a peer-reviewed academic journal of environmental economics published six times per year. It was the official journal of the Association of Environmental and Resource Economists until 2014 and publishes theoretical and empirical papers concerned with the linkage between economic systems and environmental and natural resources. When it was the official journal of the Association of Environmental and Resource Economists, the journal was generally regarded as the top journal in natural resources and environmental economics. Ralph d'Arge and Allen V. Kneese were the founding editors. The current editors-in-chief are Roger von Haefen (North Carolina State University) and Andreas Lange (University of Hamburg). Previous editors include Till Requate, Daniel J. Phaneuf, Joseph Herriges, and Charles F. Mason.

Most-cited papers 
According to the Web of Science, the following papers have been cited most often:
 Valuing public-goods - the purchase of moral satisfaction, Kahneman D, Knetsch JL, Vol. 22(1) 57-70, 1992
 Hedonic housing prices and demand for clean-air, Harrison D, Rubinfeld DL, Vol. 5(1) 81-102, 1978
 Environmental-quality and development - is there a kuznets curve for air-pollution emissions, Selden TM, Song DQ, Vol. 27(2) 147-162, 1994
 A new paradigm for valuing non-market goods using referendum data - maximum-likelihood estimation by censored logistic-regression, Cameron TA, Vol. 15(3) 355-379, 1988
 Combining revealed and stated preference methods for valuing environmental amenities, Adamowicz W, Louviere J, Williams M, Vol. 26(3) 271-292, 1994

See also 
 Environmental resources management
 Environmental tariff
 Association of Environmental and Resource Economists

References

External links
 

Economics journals
Environmental economics
Bimonthly journals
Publications established in 1974
English-language journals
Elsevier academic journals
Environmental social science journals